Multilingua, Journal of Cross-Cultural and Interlanguage Communication is a bimonthly peer-reviewed academic journal in linguistics, specializing in the sociolinguistics of multilingualism, language learning, intercultural communication, and translation and interpreting. The journal was established in 1982 and is published by de Gruyter Mouton.

Publication history
The journal was established in 1982 with the support of the Commission of the European Communities to "provide an interface between the Institutions and the members of the public who are interested in multilingualism, be they teachers, translators or interpreters, computer experts, publishers or librarians, businessmen or politicians."

The founding editor-in-chief was Juan Carlos Sager, who edited the journal until 1987. He was succeeded by Richard J. Watts who served in that position until 2013. His successor is Ingrid Piller.

Abstracting and indexing
The journal is abstracted and indexed in:

According to the Journal Citation Reports, the journal has a 2020 impact factor of 1.339.

References

External links

Works about multilingualism
Linguistics journals
De Gruyter academic journals
Publications established in 1982
Bimonthly journals